Gonzalo René Lauler Godoy (born 14 January 1989) is a Chilean footballer. He currently plays for Deportes Melipilla.

Honours

Player
Provincial Osorno
 Primera B (1): 2007

References
 
 

1989 births
Living people
Chilean footballers
Audax Italiano footballers
Provincial Osorno footballers
Deportes Temuco footballers
A.C. Barnechea footballers
Primera B de Chile players
Chilean Primera División players
Association football defenders
People from Osorno, Chile